John Paul II Catholic Secondary School, often referred to as JPII, John Paul, or Jp; is a secondary school in London, Ontario. It is administered by the London District Catholic School Board. It is located at 1300 Oxford Street East, at the northeast corner of Oxford and Highbury Avenue, next to Fanshawe College and Robarts School for the Deaf. The property is quite large and occupies the corner of Oxford and Fanshawe.

The school opened in 1985 and was originally located on Huron Street. The current building at Oxford and Highbury was opened in 1991.

The school received national attention as it became the first fully carbon-neutral school in Canada in November 2021. The project was unveiled in 2019 and received $4.8 million CAD from Natural Resources Canada (NRCan), and was built and managed by Ameresco. The process involved installing solar panels on the roof and above the parking lots, a geothermal exchange system, and Tesla batteries. 

The School is well known for its technology department and sports departments. Classes include the following: Transportation, Construction, Manufacturing, Hospitality, Dance, Drama, Guitar, Vocals, Co-Op and several others.

Like all London District Catholic School Board schools, it is a uniform only school. The school's colours are maroon, black, beige, and white, and its team name is Jaguars (or "Jags").  Its motto is maturare in dignitatem ("mature in dignity").

This school was named after Pope John Paul II.

The school houses a "cafetorium", which is a fusion between a cafeteria and an auditorium. It has a cafeteria area with a stage that houses extra seating underneath. The entire room can be turned into a theatre, as is common with the school's frequent live musical performances. The school's stage was also well known for Just for Laughs.

The school was host to one of the biggest high school charity events across London, Ontario called JP2 ONERUN. It was a breast cancer run that took place on the last Friday of every May. The event was very popular amongst students.

The school runs a charity effort every year named "Be An Angel Campaign", which occurs in December. Its main focus is providing monetary support for local disenfranchised families during Christmas.

History
Points of Interest:
 Originally opened on September 2, 1985 in the former St. Lawrence Elementary School at 920 Huron St.
 Original school population of 171 grade 9 and 10 students
 New building officially opened on October 19, 1991
 Team Name: Jaguars
 School Colours: maroon, white, beige, black
 School Motto: Maturare In Dignitatem - "Mature in Dignity"
 John Paul II has a diverse, multi-cultural student population
 John Paul II is a leader in technological studies and has formal partnerships with Fanshawe College, triOS College and local industry
 The school has an extremely low drop-out rate (less than 2%) and the majority of John Paul II graduates go on to college and university

JP2 ONERUN
The school was host to one of the biggest high school charity events across London, Ontario called JP2 ONERUN. It was a breast cancer run that takes place on the last Friday of every May. The event was run by JP2 graduate, Justin Tiseo, and teachers Shawn Pede and Frank Delle Donne. The event raised over $170,000 donating to local hospitals LHSC and St. Joseph's breast cancer unit. The event consisted of over 800 students from John Paul II and other schools (including Western University and Fanshawe College) around the city.

Be An Angel Campaign
The "Be An Angel Campaign" occurs every year around December, with the primary goal of providing financial aide for local families in need for Christmas. The campaign is managed by both members of staff and the Student Council in joint. The primary methods of fundraising is through baked goods sales, paid dress-down days where students are allowed to wear non-uniform clothes if they bring in a small amount of money, and sales of seasonal drinks.

Courses 
John Paul II offers a wide variety of courses, especially in the technology department.

Technology 
 Specialist High Skills Majors (SHSM) programs offered in Manufacturing, Design, Transportation and Culinary Arts.
 Manufacturing Technology 
 Transportation Technology
 Design Technology
 Construction Technology
 Computer Engineering
 Culinary Arts (Hospitality)
 Communications Technology

Athletics and Sports 
 Gym 
 Fitness

Arts 
 Visual art
 Sculpting 
 Painting
 Drama
 Vocals
 Music
 Guitar
 Dance
 Digital Art

Clubs and School Community 
The school hosts a wide variety of extra-curricular activities and clubs available for all students to join, such as Band, Student Council, Choir, Soccer, Rugby, Volleyball, Dance Basketball, Hockey, Golf, Cross Country, Badminton, Baseball, Trivia, and Track and Field. 

A Writing club was present at the school for a short number of years, created and headed by Canadian author Allan Lacoursiere. Named "The Pens of John Paul II", they published four novels before disbanding after the departure of Lacoursiere. 

The school community is quite inclusive, as staff encourages acceptance and respect, as well as other virtues. Bullying is not tolerated. Many students have backgrounds including Filipino, Polish, South Sudanese, Assyrian, Italian, Portuguese, Cambodian, British, and Aboriginal. 
The school has many events throughout the year. The Pep Rally, Red Feather United Way Football Game, and the school's football games against other schools in the London District Catholic School Board, occur near the beginning of the year. JP2 ONERUN happens in May. In May, the school has their Multicultural Festival, to celebrate the racial and ethnic diversity of the school community. Off-Uniform Days are on the last Tuesdays of each month, but other off uniform days fall on Spirit Day, Halloween, the last class before the Holidays, Valentine's Day, and Saint Patrick's Day. Student Council Elections happen at the end of the year, where Student Council members for the next year are elected.

Each year, Jp2 produces musicals. Some notable shows are:

 Godspell (2011)
 Oliver! (2012)
 Annie (2013)
 Hairspray (2014)
 Beauty and the Beast (2015)
 The Addams Family (2016)
 Rock of Ages (2018)

See also
List of high schools in Ontario

References

External links

 Website

High schools in London, Ontario
Educational institutions established in 1985
1985 establishments in Ontario
Catholic secondary schools in Ontario